Don't Cry, Nanking, also known as Nanjing 1937, is a 1995 Chinese film about the 1937 Nanking Massacre committed by the Imperial Japanese Army in the former capital city Nanjing, China.

Plot
Set in late December 1937, the story focuses on a family, a Chinese doctor, his pregnant Japanese wife and their two children, who escaped the Battle of Shanghai hoping to seek refuge in the capital where the doctor was born.

Being Japanese, the wife must hide her origins to the Chinese citizens, but soon upon their arrival, the city is invaded by the Imperial Japanese Army and this time, it is the father who tries to hide his identity as the family tries to reach the safety zone established by the International Committee for Nanking Safety Zone.

Among historical characters such as John Rabe and Minnie Vautrin, the film also features an out-of-context excerpt of the infamous Contest to kill 100 people using a sword between Toshiaki Mukai and Tsuyochi Noda.

There are some painful and brutal scenes such as the execution, by machine gun, of thousands of Chinese prisoners of war.

Being produced before the publishing of such books like Iris Chang's The Rape of Nanking and Herbert Bix's Hirohito and the Making of Modern Japan, the movie shows General Iwane Matsui giving the order to "kill all the captives" and omits any reference to Prince Asaka.

Cast
Chin Han - Shing Yin
Rene Liu - Shu Qin
Cho Yuet - Lui Oi
Ulrich Ottenburger - John Rabe
Michael Zannett - John Magee
Rebecca Peyrelon - missionary Miss Hua

Reception 
Upon its release in 1995, the movie grossed HK$2,102,915 in Hong Kong. The film was not released in Japan until December 1997, nearly two years after its completion.

See also 
Nanking (film)
Black Sun: The Nanking Massacre
Japanese war crimes
The Tokyo Trial (film)

References

External links

Don't Cry, Nanjing from the Chinese Movie Database
Article on director Wu Ziniu

Nanjing Massacre films
Second Sino-Japanese War films
1995 films
1990s Mandarin-language films
Chinese war drama films
Films set in the 1930s
Films directed by Wu Ziniu
Films scored by Tan Dun
1990s war drama films
1995 drama films
Chinese World War II films